Campbelltown is an Amerindian village in the Potaro-Siparuni Region of Guyana, north of Mahdia. The village has been named after Stephen Campbell, the first Amerindian member of Parliament in Guyana.

Overview
Campbelltown is managed by the village Captain (Toshao), a Vice Captain and five councillors. This community has a population of about 300 persons, being Amerindians and mixed people of part Amerindian descent. Most residents of this village are members of the Patamona tribe, but the village has become mixed with Arawak and Carib tribes. There has been some degree of integration between the Amerindians and Afro-Guyanese and the Brazilian miners. The village has merged with neighbouring Mahdia, and is not listed separately on the census. Even though Mahdia has a town status, Campbelltown is still governed by the Toshao.

Farming is the main economic activity and subsistence farming is practised by the residents on farmlands miles away from the village. Some of the Amerindian men are employed as guides, gold miners, labourers and drivers. Some women from this area work at the Regional Office, the schools and some of the stores in the Madhia community. Most of the other residents hunt, fish and farm for their livelihood. The women reported that men live in the mining camps. This has resulted in several families being headed by women.

There are no industries, shops or businesses in this community. There is a community ground and an Amerindian hostel which provides free accommodation for Amerindian miners and families who are in-transit.

The community has a well which is powered by a windpump. Residents usually depend on rainwater and creek water
whenever the well malfunctions. Campbelltown has no other utility service. This community is accessible by road from Mahdia and by trail linked to the Bartica/Potaro road.

References

Indigenous villages in Guyana
Populated places in Potaro-Siparuni